Le Mourin is a mountain of the Swiss Pennine Alps, located west of Bourg-Saint-Pierre in the canton of Valais. On its south-east side the mountain overlooks the Lac des Toules.

References

External links
 Le Mourin on Hikr

Mountains of the Alps
Mountains of Switzerland
Mountains of Valais